Cyclophora aedes is a moth in the  family Geometridae. Described by Louis Beethoven Prout in 1938, it is found on Peninsular Malaysia.

References

Moths described in 1938
Cyclophora (moth)
Moths of Asia